Francisco Diaz de Cabrera y Córdoba, O.P. (died April 26, 1620) was a Roman Catholic prelate who served as the Bishop of Trujillo (1614–1620) and the Bishop of Puerto Rico (1611–1614).

Biography
Francisco Diaz de Cabrera y Córdoba was born in Córdoba, Spain and ordained a priest in the Order of Preachers. On August 17, 1611, he was appointed by the King of Spain and confirmed by Pope Paul V as Bishop of Puerto Rico. On October 6, 1614, he was appointed by the King of Spain and confirmed by Pope Paul V as Bishop of Trujillo. He served as Bishop of Trujillo until his death on April 26, 1620.

References

External links and additional sources
 (for Chronology of Bishops) 
 (for Chronology of Bishops) 
 (for Chronology of Bishops) 
 (for Chronology of Bishops) 

1620 deaths
Bishops appointed by Pope Paul V
Dominican bishops
17th-century Roman Catholic bishops in Puerto Rico
Roman Catholic bishops of Trujillo